Peter Ronald Brown (born 1 September 1961 in Hemel Hempstead, Hertfordshire) is an English former professional footballer who played in the Football League, as a right back.
Peter was presented with Barnet Football Club's Player of the Season in 1984–85.

References

External links
 
 Reckless Guide to Barnet FC Tony Hammond

1961 births
Association football fullbacks
Barnet F.C. players
Chelsea F.C. players
English footballers
National League (English football) players
Footballers from Hertfordshire
Sportspeople from Hemel Hempstead
Living people
English Football League players
Wimbledon F.C. players